The Entwicklung series (from German Entwicklung, "development"), more commonly known as the E-Series, was a late-World War II attempt by Nazi Germany to produce a standardised series of tank designs. There were to be standard designs in five different weight classes (E-10, E-25, E-50, E-75 and E-100) from which several specialised variants were to be developed. This intended to reverse the favor of extremely complex tank designs that had resulted in poor production rates and mechanical unreliability.

The E-series designs were simpler, cheaper to produce and more efficient than their predecessors; however, their design offered only modest improvements in armour and firepower over the designs they were intended to replace, such as the Jagdpanzer 38(t), Panther Ausf. G or Tiger II; and would have represented the final standardization of German armoured vehicle design.  Indeed, nearly all of the E-series vehicles — up through and including the E-75 — were intended to use what were essentially the Tiger II's eighty centimeter diameter, steel-rimmed road wheels for their suspension, meant to overlap each other (as on the later production Tiger E and Panther designs that also used them), abandoning the interleaved Schachtellaufwerk roadwheel system that first appeared on German military half-tracks in the early 1930s.

Jagdpanzer E-10

Said to have been designed by the Klockner-Humboldt-Deutz Magirus AG firm in Ulm, the E-10 project (development name - "Hetzer") was developed as a replacement for the Jagdpanzer 38(t). The name Hetzer was never officially used for the 38(t).

The designs based on this new chassis would all be in the 10 to 25 tonnes weight class, and using only four Tiger II-style but larger all-steel road wheels per side in an overlapping layout for its main "slack-track" suspension with no return rollers and a rear drive sprocket. Much simplified was the suspension, which was intended to be based on the concept of using conical-spring Belleville washers for the E-series AFVs as a whole. These were simply bolted on to the chassis and could be easily removed for repair or replacement. This suspension system was later used on the Swiss Panzer 61. A most interesting aspect was the ability to lower the hull by placing the pivot points of the suspension units higher in respect to the hull bottom; by not having torsion-bars occupying the entire hull planform in the lowermost interior areas of the hull, but via cranks driven by hydraulic actuators on the sides of the hull. This reduced the height of the vehicles from 176 cm to 140 cm. 

The intention was to create several new light tank destroyers as a replacement for the Jagdpanzer 38(t), as well as a new family of gun platforms (Waffenträger) armed with heavy anti-tank guns. However, from September 1944 the design was abandoned in favour of a redesigned and enlarged Jagdpanzer 38(t), using German parts as opposed to the Czech parts for the Jagdpanzer 38(t). This new design was called Jagdpanzer 38D, and was to use a Tatra 12-cylinder air-cooled diesel engine similar to the one fitted to the Sd.Kfz. 234 'Puma'. None of these vehicles reached series production.

Jagdpanzer E-25

The E-25 designs, in the 25-50 tonnes weight class, were to be the replacements of all Panzer III and Panzer IV based designs, with involvement of the Alkett, Argus, Adler and Porsche firms. This family would include medium reconnaissance vehicles, medium Jagdpanzer vehicles and heavy Waffenträger vehicles. All would use five Tiger II style road wheels but larger per side in a similar overlapping layout to the lighter E-10 suspension, as well as  "slack-track" design and a rear drive sprocket.
As main armament, a 75 mm Pak 42 L/70 was planned, with a possible MG in a small turret.  Overall, this vehicle would have been similar to the Hetzer tank destroyer. The tank would have been very maneuverable, and due to its low profile, hard to spot on the battlefield.

E-50 Standardpanzer

The E-50 Standardpanzer was intended as a standard medium tank, replacing the Panther and Tiger I and the conversions based on these tanks. The E-50 hull was to be longer than the Panther – in fact it was practically identical to the Königstiger (Tiger II) in overall dimensions except for the upper and lower glacis plate layout. Compared to these earlier designs however, the amount of drilling and machining involved in producing these Standardpanzer was reduced drastically, which would have made them quicker, easier and cheaper to produce, as would the proposed conical spring system, replacing their predecessors' torsion bar system which required a special steel alloy.

A new turret was to be designed for the E-50 and E-75, but drawings were never made and the turret was never even conceptualised. Armament is also not confirmed in any sources.

As indicated by its name, the weight of the E-50 would fall between 50 and 75 tonnes. The engine was an improved Maybach HL234 which had 900 hp. Maximum speed was supposed to be 60 km/h.

E-75 Standardpanzer

The E-75 Standardpanzer was intended to be the standard heavy tank to be used as a replacement of the Tiger II and Jagdtiger. The E-75 would have been built on the same production lines as the E-50 for ease of manufacture, and the two vehicles were to share many components, including the same Maybach HL 234 engine. 
The E-75 would have had much thicker armour however, and in fact compared to the Tiger II the E-75 had improved hull armour all round. As its name indicates, the resulting vehicle would have weighed in at over 75 tonnes, reducing its speed to around 40 km/h. To offset the increased weight, the bogies were spaced differently than on the E-50, with an extra pair added on each side, giving the E-75 a slightly improved track to ground contact length. According to some sources, the similarities between the E-50 and the E-75 went further; they were to be equipped with the same turret and 88 mm L/71 or L/100 gun, along with an optical rangefinder for increased long range accuracy (German scientists and engineers had successfully designed a 'schmal' or narrow turret and infra-red lighting and sights for use on the prototype [Panther F],  as the war drew to a close).

Other sources however, indicate that the E-75 was to be fitted with the much larger Tiger II turret, which could be adapted to accommodate an even more powerful high velocity 10.5 cm gun.

E-100

The earliest ancestor of the E-100 was the Tiger-Maus. It was supposed to be a simplified Maus. The Tiger-Maus was never built, but it was to use components from the Tiger I Ausf. H and a slightly modified turret from the Maus.

The E-100 was to be a superheavy combat tank designed to be the replacement for the prototype-only, Porsche-designed Maus. Development and building of a prototype E-100 started in 1944 but was largely abandoned after Adolf Hitler ordered an end to the development of the Maus.

Only the chassis was finished. It was taken to the United Kingdom for evaluation purposes and eventually scrapped.

During early development the Maus turret was used on the E-100, but later a modified Maus II turret was proposed to have been used. It would have housed 128 mm KwK 44 L/55 (75 rounds) and a 7.5 cm KwK 37 L/24.

According to Panzer Tracts 6-3, there was a proposal for the 15 cm KwK 44 L/38 to be mounted on the E-100 as well. The US military magazine Armor reported in its 
January–February 1959 edition that a 150 mm cannon was considered for the E-100 during the Second World War. This was also reported by Anthony Tucker-Jones. According to Kenneth Estes, a 150 mm or even 170 mm gun was proposed for the E-100 but Estes reports that Dr Karl Jenschke, the Adler works technical director and chief constructor, considered this only possible on an assault gun variant of such a vehicle, because the turret space could not support such weapons.

Estes reports the following specifications for the E-100:
 Crew: 6
 Weight: 123.5 ton design
 Power-to-weight ratio: 4.8
 Length: 11.073 m overall (8.733 chassis)
 Width: 4.48 m
 Height: 3.375 m
 Turret basket diameter: N/A
 Engines: Maybach HL230 V-12 gasoline, 700 hp; the theoretical replacement was the experimental fuel-injected HL234 developing 900 hp, which never reached series production
 Transmission: ZF Olvar pre-selector gearbox OG 40 12 16B; for the HL234 engine, a Mekydro transmission was specified
 Fuel capacity: 2050 L internal
 Max speed (road): 23 km/h
 Max range: 160 km
 Ground clearance: 0.5 m
 Ground pressure: 1.26 kg/cm2 (17.93 psi)
 Armament: 128 mm KwK 44 L/55, one 75 mm L/24, one MG-34. Elevation -7/+20 degrees. Ammunition stowage unknown.
 Armour (mm/angle in degrees from vertical):
 Hull front: 200/60 upper, 150/50 lower
 Hull sides: 120/0
 Hull rear: 150/30
 Hull top: 40/90 forward
 Hull bottom: 80/90 forward, 40/90 aft
 Turret front: 200/30
 Turret side: 80/29
 Turret rear: 150/15
 Turret roof: 40/90

Post-war development
After the war, the French designed and built the AMX-50 series of armoured fighting vehicles, which used a 1000 hp Maybach engine with rear drive, as had been intended for the E-50 and E-75, whilst the idea of external Belleville washer suspension - which was also developed with the Entwicklung series in mind - resurfaced on the Swiss Panzer 61.

Notes

References
 Information about the E-100 at Panzerworld
 German Tanks of World War II: The Complete Illustrated history of German Armoured Fighting Vehicles 1926-1945, F. M. von Senger und Etterlin, translated by J. Lucas, Galahad Books, New York, 1969, 
 Special Panzer Variants: Development . Production . Operations, Walter J. Spielberger and Hilary L. Doyle, Schiffer Publishing, Atglen PA, 2007, 
 Panzer Tracts No. 6-3 Schwere-Panzerkampfwagen Maus and E 100 development and production from 1942 to 1945, Thomas L. Jentz and Hilary L. Doyle, Panzer Pacts, 2008

External links
 TheUntoldPast's video review of the E-series tanks

World War II tanks of Germany